Otwell is an unincorporated census-designated place in Jefferson Township, Pike County, in the U.S. state of Indiana.

History
Otwell was originally called Pierceville, being named after President Franklin Pierce, and under this name was laid out in 1855. The name was changed to Otwell in 1864 by a popular petition of its residents. The name had to be changed when the post office came because there was already a Pierceville in Indiana. The name Otwell is derived from the middle name of Robert Otwell Brown, the son of an early settler.

A post office has been in operation at Otwell since 1864.

Geography
Otwell sits along Indiana State Road 257 and is approximately 1 mile from Indiana State Road 56.

Education
Otwell has a public library, a branch of the Pike County Public Library.

Otwell has a charter school which was established in 2017 after the local school corporation closed its elementary school. Otwell Miller Academy currently enrolls 88 students for the 2018/19 school year. Grace College sponsors the charter.

Demographics

References

Census-designated places in Pike County, Indiana
Census-designated places in Indiana
Jasper, Indiana micropolitan area